Les cloches de Corneville  is a 1917 British silent drama film directed by Thomas Bentley and starring Elsie Craven, Moya Mannering and Leslie Stiles. It was based on the 1876 French opera Les cloches de Corneville by Robert Planquette. It was made at Bushey Studios.

Cast
 Elsie Craven as Germaine
 Moya Mannering as Serpolette
 M. R. Morand as Gaspard
 Leslie Stiles as Grenicheaux
 Frederick Volpe as Baillie
 Ben Field as Iolo
 Arthur Vezin as Marquis de Corneville

Bibliography
 Low, Rachael. History of the British Film, 1914-1918. Routledge, 2005.

External links

1917 films
1917 drama films
British drama films
1910s English-language films
Films directed by Thomas Bentley
British silent feature films
Films based on operas
Films set in France
British black-and-white films
1910s British films
Silent drama films